Five Houses, Nova Scotia could be the following places in Nova Scotia:

 Five Houses, Colchester County
 Five Houses, Lunenburg County